The 1946 Chicago Cubs season was the 75th season of the Chicago Cubs franchise, the 71st in the National League and the 31st at Wrigley Field. The Cubs finished third in the National League with a record of 82–71.

Offseason 
 Prior to 1946 season: Hal Jeffcoat was signed as an amateur free agent by the Cubs.

Regular season

Season standings

Record vs. opponents

Notable transactions 
 June 26, 1946: Heinz Becker was traded by the Cubs to the Cleveland Indians for Mickey Rocco and cash.

Roster

Player stats

Batting

Starters by position 
Note: Pos = Position; G = Games played; AB = At bats; H = Hits; Avg. = Batting average; HR = Home runs; RBI = Runs batted in

Other batters 
Note: G = Games played; AB = At bats; H = Hits; Avg. = Batting average; HR = Home runs; RBI = Runs batted in

Pitching

Starting pitchers 
Note: G = Games pitched; IP = Innings pitched; W = Wins; L = Losses; ERA = Earned run average; SO = Strikeouts

Other pitchers 
Note: G = Games pitched; IP = Innings pitched; W = Wins; L = Losses; ERA = Earned run average; SO = Strikeouts

Relief pitchers 
Note: G = Games pitched; W = Wins; L = Losses; SV = Saves; ERA = Earned run average; SO = Strikeouts

Farm system 

LEAGUE CHAMPIONS: Hutchinson; LEAGUE CO-CHAMPIONS: Iola

References

External links
1946 Chicago Cubs season at Baseball Reference

Chicago Cubs seasons
Chicago Cubs season
Chicago Cubs